Odessa Cleveland is an American film and television actress.

Early years
Born in Louisiana, Cleveland graduated from Peabody High School. She graduated from Grambling State University with a BS degree in physical education and English and a master's degree in business management and education.

Career
A life member of The Actors Studio, Cleveland is best known for her role as Lieutenant Ginger Bayliss, a recurring character on the television series M*A*S*H, on which she appeared for 26 episodes from 1972 to 1975.

Cleveland also had a guest role in an episode of the CBS-TV series M*A*S*H spin-off Trapper John, M.D. in 1986. Beginning as a receptionist and writer at the Watts Writer's Workshop/Theater in Los Angeles, and under the tutelage of Budd Schulberg, Odessa began appearing in such productions as Black Girl in Search of God at Jim Wood's Studio Watts Theater in Los Angeles.

In 1974, she portrayed Jim's slave wife in the 1974 musical release of Huckleberry Finn.

Cleveland taught in the Los Angeles Unified School District.

Filmography

Television works

References

External links
 

American television actresses
Living people
Actresses from Louisiana
American film actresses
20th-century American actresses
21st-century American women
Year of birth missing (living people)